Grarem Gouga is a town in Grarem municipality, Grarem Gouga District, Mila Province, Algeria.

Notable people
 Yacine Bezzaz - Algerian international footballer

References

Communes of Mila Province
Mila Province